The Avro 730 was a planned Mach 3 reconnaissance aircraft and strategic bomber that was being developed by Avro Aircraft for the Royal Air Force (RAF). It had been originally envisioned as a very high-speed aircraft to perform aerial reconnaissance missions, conforming with the requirements of Air Ministry Specification OR.330. Avro subsequently decided to modify the design of the proposed 730 in order to accommodate its arming with nuclear weapons; this change therefore meant that the type would be able to perform the nuclear weapons delivery mission as well, which had been called for under Air Ministry Specification RB.156T which sought a high speed reconnaissance-bomber aircraft.

If the Avro 730 had proceeded into service, it would have replaced the V bombers as the primary airborne platform as a part of Britain's nuclear deterrent. In early 1957, the Avro 730 was abruptly cancelled, along with the development of a number of other crewed aircraft, as a consequence of the 1957 Defence White Paper. Part of the reason for the cancellation was the perception that by the time it would enter service, Soviet anti-aircraft capabilities would have improved to the point where it would not be able to succeed in its mission; a preference for missile development over crewed aircraft was another factor. A successor high-speed bomber flying at low level to evade radar would be developed to meet Air Ministry Specification GOR.339, designated as the BAC TSR-2; however, this too would be eventually cancelled.

Development

Origins
Following the end of the Second World War and facing the threats of the newly emerging Cold War, the Royal Air Force (RAF) was keen to not only preserve but to strengthen its strategic capabilities. In particular, RAF Bomber Command sought to replace its inventory of wartime bombers with more capable models that would take advantage of the latest technologies, such as jet propulsion and nuclear weapons. During the late 1940s and early 1950s, an entirely new jet-powered bomber fleet comprising three aircraft, the Vickers Valiant, the Avro Vulcan, and Handley Page Victor, which were collectively known as the V-bombers, were developed and introduced to service with the RAF. The V-bombers were purpose-built to be armed with the first generation of Britain's nuclear weapons, designated as Blue Danube, and served as the airborne carriers of Britain's nuclear deterrence for many years.

Even as the V-bombers were being introduced, the RAF had identified a need for a very-long range supersonic strategic reconnaissance aircraft for the purpose of supporting the V bombers during their offensive mission. As such, the Air Staff set about formulating an Operational Requirement; in 1954, Specification OR.330, which specified the required performance attributes for such an aircraft, was issued accordingly. The envisioned reconnaissance aircraft would be capable of successfully entering the airspace of the Soviet Union while avoiding the sophisticated hostile air defenses intended to combat such an intrusion. In order to achieve this feat, the aircraft would have to be capable of maintaining Mach 2.5 at an altitude of 60,000 ft (18,300 m), along with the ability to attain at least Mach 3 and operate at a maximum range of 5,754 mi (9,260 km). By operating at such a high altitude and speed, along with assorted advanced electronic systems on board, it was believed that the specified aircraft would be capable of evading the threats posed by Soviet interceptor aircraft and newly developed surface-to-air missiles alike.

Upon its issuing, Specification OR.330 effectively called for the most ambitious high-performance aircraft in the world. At the time, Britain lacked any operational combat aircraft capable of supersonic flight; as such, meeting the specification required industry to embrace leading edge aerodynamic theory, new materials and futuristic propulsion systems. In response, there were a total three submissions made from British aircraft manufacturers: the Handley Page HP.100, Vickers SP4, and the Avro Type 730. All were futuristic delta or needle shapes in appearance employing multiple engines, 12 on the HP.100, 16 mounted horizontally at the rear of the Vickers. Work on the HP.100 proceeded to a full-scale mockup and large-scale wind tunnel testing. However, in mid-1955, Avro were issued with a contract by the Ministry of Supply to develop their submission aircraft.

Development work and repurposing
The Avro 730 was an unswept canard design, making extensive use of stainless steel and powered by a total of four Armstrong Siddeley P.176 turbojet engines. As an aid to development, the Bristol Type 188 aircraft was built to test the compound-delta wing shape, and later, the effects of prolonged supersonic flight on metal. Up to 10 prototypes of the aircraft were proposed, necessitated in part by a decision made part-way through the development process to give the aircraft a bombing capability.

The initial version of the aircraft had been intended strictly for the aerial reconnaissance role, for which it would have employed its "Red Drover" sideways-looking radar to find targets for attack by the V bomber force that would follow. As development had progressed, it became clear that the radar would not necessitate as bulky an antenna as initially believed, which had the result of freeing up considerable internal space. In response, the RAF began to concentrate on a secondary bombing role for the type, for which it was to carry both the radar along with a long bomb bay, in which either a weapon or additional fuel could be contained within. A high-speed bomber requirement was also being studied at the time, OR.336, so the two projects were combined into the new RB.156 requirement in October 1955. This led to the Avro 730 undergoing a fairly substantial redesign to correspond with the new requirements being issued. Avro had anticipated this eventuality in their original submission.

The envisioned test program was to have been quite thorough, which would have involved subjected full-scale aircraft to the severe temperatures anticipated at Mach 2.5 flight via a purpose-built heat chamber; upon reaching the flight testing phase, the prototypes had been scheduled to perform a total of 1,400 flight hours. The first prototype, which had received the internal designation Avro 731, a three-eighths scale aircraft for testing purposes, was scheduled to fly in 1959. A pair of Avro 731 prototypes were set to be built and flown in advance of the full-scale prototypes.

The first prototype was under construction when the minister, Duncan Sandys, announced the decision to cancel its development in 1957. It had been suspected that by the time the aircraft came into service a decade later it would have been vulnerable to Soviet advances in anti-aircraft missile technology. Effort was instead transferred to the Blue Streak medium-range ballistic missile, while the sole 730 test fuselage was cut up. The Bristol 188 project continued despite the cancellation of the 730. Aspects and influences of the Avro 730 encouraged studies at the Royal Aircraft Establishment, Farnborough, into supersonic transport aircraft, which in turn eventually contributed to the development effort behind Concorde.

Design
The Avro 730 was a very high speed aircraft that was originally designed solely for aerial reconnaissance purposes. In order to achieve the desired high speed performance, the aircraft consisted of a long, slender fuselage with a high fineness ratio and a small, tapered, almost rectangular wing that was mounted centrally on the fuselage. The wing's relative shortness and straightness enabled the lengthy aerial for the primary reconnaissance sensor, the Red Drover X-band radar, to be contained within the fuselage, as the wing provided little obstruction and therefore little interference with the radar. A total of four Armstrong-Siddeley P.156 engines, mounted two apiece in an over-under arrangement of pods positioned at the extreme tips of the wings, provided propulsion. The engine nacelles included variable-geometry air intakes while the engines themselves were equipped with convergent-divergent nozzles. Alternative arrangements of two or three shock cones could have been installed on the nacelles.

The aircraft adopted an atypical tail-first configuration; this approach had the effect of greatly reducing trim-drag while also generating increased lift at slower speeds. Longitudinal control was provided by the nose-mounted tail plane via trailing edge elevators, lateral control was enacted by ailerons located on the wing's trailing edge, and directional control was achieved by a conventional rudder. All four of the primary flight control surfaces were actuated by a quadruple-redundant electro-hydraulic control unit, designed by Boulton Paul. Fly-by-wire electrical controls and automatic control systems were also to be employed on the type. The undercarriage, designed by Dowty Group, used an arrangement of a single centre-fuselage main unit complete with four wheels, a nose unit with two wheels, and a pair of outriggers located on the engine nacelles.

The Avro 730 lacked a conventional canopy in order to maintain the fineness ratio, the cockpit featured only two small windows facing to the side. On the intended initial development models, a raised canopy would have been present for direct vision; however, production aircraft would have made sole use of an electrically operated retractable periscope in order to provide an external view, including during take-off and landing. As originally envisioned, a crew of three would be carried: pilot, navigator and radar operator. All three were to be contained within the same compartment, which was both pressurised and refrigerated for passenger comfort; lightweight ejection seats were to be provisioned for all crew members. Due to features such as the automatic flight controls and stabilisation systems, the pilot was intended to be capable of supervising some of the aircraft's engineering functions as well, such as the control system, cooling and fuel systems.

Cooling was a critical issue for the Avro 730; at Mach 2, the external skin was anticipated to reach 190 °C, this would rise to 277 °C at Mach 2.7. Much of the aircraft was to be composed of a stainless steel brazed-honeycomb structure. Fuel onboard had the additional role of serving as a heat sink, and a fully duplicated freon-based refrigeration system provided by Normalair was also present.

During development, the Avro 730 underwent re-design work so that it could perform as a bomber as well as a reconnaissance platform. Although the new version looked much like the original, it was larger overall and featured a new wing planform. In order to increase wing area, extra "winglettes" were added outside of the engine pods and the entire planform was re-shaped to be more of a classic delta wing. The wing inside the engine pods, about ⅔ of the overall span, was swept at about 45°, the smaller area outboard of the engine was more highly swept at about 60°. The forward sweep on the trailing edge was removed. The engine pods were now specified to carry four Armstrong-Siddeley P.176 engines each, for a total of eight. The pods were circular at the front and mounted a single large shock cone, and grew progressively more "square" to the rear, where they ended flush with the rear of the wing. Much of the layout was generally the same as the earlier version, with the rectangular canards, "hidden" cockpit and large cropped-delta vertical fin at the rear.

In the new version, the crew was reduced to two members. The bomb bay was narrow but very long at 50 ft (15 m), and was intended to be armed with a nuclear-tipped stand-off missile. A suitable warhead had started development as Blue Rosette.

Specifications

See also

References
Citations

Bibliography

 Bartlett, Christopher John. "The Long Retreat: A Short History of British Defence Policy, 1945-70". Macmillan, 1971. 
 Brookes, Andrew J. "V-Force: The History of Britain's Airborne Deterrent ". Jane's, 1982.
 Bud, Robert and Philip Gummett. "Cold War, Hot Science: Applied Research in Britain's Defence Laboratories, 1945-1990". NMSI Trading Ltd, 2002. .
 Buttler, Tony. "British Secret Projects: Jet Bombers Since 1949". Midland, 2003. .
 Lewis, Peter M. H. "The British Bomber Since 1914: Sixty-Five Years of Design and Development". Putnam, 1980. .
 Polmar, Norman. "Spyplane: The U-2 History Declassified". Zenith Imprint, 2001. .
 Wood, Derek. Project Cancelled. Macdonald and Jane's Publishers, 1975. .

External links

Avro 730 Bomber (1956)
FAS.org
Virtual RAF

Cancelled military aircraft projects of the United Kingdom
730
1950s British military reconnaissance aircraft
1950s British bomber aircraft
Canard aircraft
Delta-wing aircraft
Eight-engined jet aircraft